Wilkins Mountains is a group of low mountains of about 20 nautical miles (37 km) extent, located 25 nautical miles (46 km) southeast of the Sweeney Mountains in southern Palmer Land. Discovered by the Ronne Antarctic Research Expedition (RARE), 1947–48, under Ronne, who named these mountains for Sir Hubert Wilkins.

Mountain ranges of Palmer Land